The damba mipentina (Paretroplus maculatus) is a critically endangered species of cichlid fish from turbid, shallow flood-plain lakes in the Betsiboka and Ikopa River basins in northwestern Madagascar. It has declined drastically because of habitat loss, overfishing and invasive species. It is part of a captive breeding program by public institutions like London Zoo and among fishkeeping hobbyists.

This relatively deep-bodied Paretroplus can easily be distinguished from other members of the genus by the large black spot on the side of the body. It reaches  in length.

References

Damba mipentina
Freshwater fish of Madagascar
Fish described in 1966
Taxonomy articles created by Polbot